Ophiolechia allomorpha is a moth in the family Gelechiidae. It was described by Sattler in 1996. It is found in Brazil.

References

Ophiolechia
Taxa named by Klaus Sattler
Moths described in 1996